Maternal death, also called maternal mortality, is defined by the World Health Organization (WHO) as "the death of a woman while pregnant or within 42 days of termination of pregnancy, irrespective of the duration and site of the pregnancy, from any cause related to or aggravated by the pregnancy or its management but not from accidental or incidental causes." The maternal mortality ratio, on the other hand, is the number of maternal deaths per 100,000 live births. The maternal mortality ratio is used as a criterion for the quality of medical care in a country. The global rate is 211 maternal deaths per 100,000 live births in 2017 (2017 or latest available year for some countries).


Note: Year listed indicates latest available data as of that year. Year can vary by country. 
Row numbers are static. Other columns are sortable. This allows ranking of any column.

See also
 List of countries by infant and under-five mortality rates
 Maternal mortality in the United States 
 List of countries by total health expenditure per capita

References 

   

Maternal mortality rate
Lists of countries by population-related issue
Demographic lists
Health-related lists
Death-related lists
Maternal death